ICCS stands for:

Intercollegiate Center for Classical Studies, Italy
International Catholic Conference of Scouting
International Coin Certification Service, Canada
International Commission of Control and Supervision, United Nations
International Commission on Civil Status, Europe
International Council for Canadian Studies
International Classification of Crime for Statistical Purposes, a crime classification standard; see National Crime Records Bureau